Khuram Wa Sarbagh District is a district in Samangan Province, Afghanistan.

References 

Districts of Samangan Province